Mohd Fairuz bin Abdul Aziz (born 21 August 1985) is a Malaysian footballer who plays as a defender.

Club career

Sime Darby, Selangor
Fairuz joined Sime Darby FC for the 2010 Malaysia Premier League after this club was founded on 22 January 2010. Then, he promoted Selangor FA for 2013 Malaysia Super League.

References
 Profile Fairuz Abdul Aziz

External links
 News Paper Fairuz Abdul Aziz
 

Malaysian footballers
Living people
1985 births
Sime Darby F.C. players
Selangor FA players
People from Selangor
Malaysian people of Malay descent
Association football defenders